South Centre is an intergovernmental organisation of developing nations, established by an intergovernmental agreement (treaty), which came into force on 31 July 1995, with its headquarters in Geneva, Switzerland. It functions as an independent policy think tank, whilst also holding observer status at the United Nations and other development agencies.

Creation

The South Centre was created by the South–South cooperation in 1995.

Its predecessor, the South Commission, recognized the need to strengthen South-South cooperation in international affairs. In its report The Challenge to the South, the South Commission emphasized the need for countries of the South to work together at the global level.

Observer status
The South Centre has an observer status in the following forums:

Member states

The Council of Representatives is composed of high-level representatives of the centre's member states. It meets annually, and on an inter-session basis when required, in order to examine the work of the centre and to provide policy and operational guidance. All states signing and ratifying or acceding to the agreement are required to appoint a high-level individual as their representative to the council. This individual should have been recognized for his or her commitment and contribution to the development of the South as well as the promotion of South-South cooperation. The council appoints a nine-member board and elects the centre's chairperson. From its members, the council elects a convenor and a vice-convenor.

As of 2017, the following 54 states have signed, ratified, or acceded to the intergovernmental agreement:

Former members
 (signed in 1994; ratified in 1997; denounced in 2007)
 (signed in 1994; ratified in 1996)

Publications
South Bulletin, a regular publication of the South Centre, takes stock of ongoing debates on major global policy challenges and delivers regular flow of analysis and commentary to policymakers in the South.

Research papers, published articles, analytical notes and other publications are also made available in English, French and Spanish on the South Centre website under "Publications".

References

Media
South Centre Blog
The South Centre Digital TV

External links
The South Centre
The South Centre Intergovernmental Agreement (Treaty) PDF

International development agencies
Intergovernmental organizations
United Nations General Assembly observers
Intergovernmental organizations established by treaty